Kevin McCabe (born 1960) is a former Gaelic footballer who played for the Clonoe club and the Tyrone county team. Nickname [McCabe] He has the distinction of being Tyrone's first ever All Star award winner in 1980. He was also part of the first Tyrone team to make it to the All-Ireland Final in 1986.

Between 1986 All-Ireland Final and his second Ulster title, he played for a season and a half for the Irish League football team, Portadown F.C., being their top scorer in 1983.

References

1960 births
Living people
Gaelic footballers who switched code
Tyrone inter-county Gaelic footballers
NIFL Premiership players
Portadown F.C. players
Association footballers from Northern Ireland
Association footballers not categorized by position